The following is a list 2018 NPF transactions that have occurred in the National Pro Fastpitch softball league since the completion of the 2017 season and during the 2018 season. It lists which team each player has been traded to, signed by, or claimed by, and for which player(s) or draft pick (s), if applicable. Players who have retired are also listed.  Per Commissioner Cheri Kempf's tweet, NPF contracts expire in February, therefore the extension of a contract "through 2028" means the player is only contracted to play through the 2027 season, with the contract expiring the following February.  "Thru 2028 season" therefore would mean a contract that expires in February 2029, covering only games played in 2028.

Transactions 
Source:Any transactions listed below without a reference were originally announced on

References

External links 
 

Softball in the United States
2018 in softball